Phrase completion scales are a type of psychometric scale used in questionnaires. Developed in response to the problems associated with Likert scales, Phrase completions are concise, unidimensional measures that tap ordinal level data in a manner that approximates interval level data.

Overview of the phrase completion method 

Phrase completions consist of a phrase followed by an 11-point response key. The phrase introduces part of the concept. Marking a reply on the response key completes the concept. The response key represents the underlying theoretical continuum. Zero(0)indicates the absence of the construct. Ten(10)indicates the theorized maximum amount of the construct. Response keys are reversed on alternate items to mitigate response set bias.

Sample question using the phrase completion method 
 
I am aware of the presence of God or the Divine
   Never                                                                       Continually                                                                            
    0	    1	    2	    3	    4	    5	    6	    7	    8	    9	    10

Scoring and analysis 

After the questionnaire is completed the score on each item is summed together, to create a test score for the respondent. Hence, Phrase Completions, like Likert scales, are often considered to be summative scales.

Level of measurement 

The response categories represent an ordinal level of measurement. Ordinal level data, however, varies in terms of how closely it approximates interval level data. By using a numerical continuum as the response key instead of sentiments that reflect intensity of agreement, respondents may be able to quantify their responses in more equal units.

References 

  Hodge, D. R. & Gillespie, D. F. (2003). Phrase Completions: An alternative to Likert scales. Social Work Research, 27(1), 45–55. 
  Hodge, D. R. & Gillespie, D. F. (2005). Phrase Completion Scales. In K. Kempf-Leonard (Editor). Encyclopedia of Social Measurement. (Vol. 3, pp. 53–62). San Diego: Academic Press.
  Hodge, D. R. & Gillespie, D. F. (2007). Phrase Completion Scales: A Better Measurement Approach than Likert Scales? Journal of Social Service Research, 33, (4), 1-12.

See also 
Likert scale
Analog scale
Guttman scale
Thurstone scale
Mokken scale
Bogardus Social Distance Scale
F-scale
Discan scale
Diamond of opposites

Psychometrics
Educational psychology
Market research

de:Likert-Skala